Harry de Keijser (11 September 1900 – 2 January 1995) was a Dutch athlete. He competed in three events at the 1924 Summer Olympics.

References

External links
 

1900 births
1995 deaths
Athletes (track and field) at the 1924 Summer Olympics
Dutch male pole vaulters
Dutch decathletes
Olympic athletes of the Netherlands
Sportspeople from Roosendaal
Olympic decathletes